Sika Tode is a village in East Siang district of Arunachal Pradesh, India.

References

Villages in East Siang district